Norsuriani Mazli  (born 27 April 1990) is a female Malaysian international footballer who plays as a midfielder. She is a member of the Malaysia women's national football team. She played at the 2016 AFF Women's Championship.

References

1990 births
Living people
Malaysian women's footballers
Malaysia women's international footballers
Place of birth missing (living people)
Women's association football midfielders
Competitors at the 2017 Southeast Asian Games
Southeast Asian Games competitors for Malaysia